The following is a list of Asian crime fiction writers whose works have been translated into one or more European languages. Novelists on this list should be notable in some way, and ideally have a Wikipedia article.

Crime fiction writers may include the authors of any subgenre of crime fiction, including detective, mystery, or hard-boiled.

A
Edward Atiyah (1903–1964), Lebanese

B
Ashok Banker (born 1964), Indian
Michael Bar-Zohar (born 1938), Israeli
Bimal Kar (1921–2003), Indian

C
Rajorshi Chakraborti (born 1977), Indian
Vikram Chandra (born 1961), Indian
Chin Shunshin (1924–2015), Taiwanese, Japanese
Chan Ho-Kei (born 1975), Hong Kong/Taiwan

E
Edogawa Rampo (1894–1965), Japanese

F
Shamini Flint (born 1969), Malaysian

G
Batya Gur (1947–2005), Israeli

H
He Jiahong (born 1953), Chinese
Keigo Higashino (born 1958), Japanese

I
Kotaro Isaka (born 1971), Japanese
Ibn-e-Safi (1928–1980), Pakistani
Ira Ishida (born 1960), Japanese

K
Kim Young-ha (born 1968), South Korean
Natsuo Kirino (born 1951), Japanese
Kenzo Kitakata (born 1947), Japanese
Natsuhiko Kyogoku (born 1963), Japanese

L
Shulamit Lapid (born 1934), Israeli

M
Seicho Matsumoto (1909–1992), Japanese
Miyuki Miyabe (born 1960), Japanese

N
Kyotaro Nishimura (born 1930), Japanese
Asa Nonami (born 1960), Japanese
Jamyang Norbu (born 1949), Tibetan

O
Kido Okamoto (1872–1939), Japanese
Celil Oker (born 1952), Turkish
Go Osaka (born 1943), Japanese
Arimasa Osawa (born 1956), Japanese
Otsuichi (born 1978), Japanese

R
Satyajit Ray (1921–1992), Indian

S
Joh Sasaki (born 1950), Japanese
Soji Shimada (born 1948), Japanese
Mehmet Murat Somer (born 1959), Turkish
Kalpana Swaminathan (born 1956), Indian
Vikas Swarup, Indian
Sharadindu Bandyopadhyay, (1899–1970), Indian

T
Akimitsu Takagi (1920–1995), Japanese
Tetsuo Takashima (born 1949), Japanese
Masako Togawa (1933–2016), Japanese

U
Ahmet Ümit (born 1960), Turkish

V
Nury Vittachi (born 1958)

W
Wang Shuo (born 1958), Chinese

Y
Seishi Yokomizo (1902–1981), Japanese
Kyusaku Yumeno (1889–1936), Japanese

Organizations
Mystery Writers of Japan (founded in 1947)
Honkaku Mystery Writers Club of Japan (founded in 2000)

See also
List of crime writers
List of mystery writers
List of European mystery writers
List of thriller authors

Asian crime fiction writers
Asian crime fiction writers
Crime fiction writers
Asian crime fiction writers